Georgi Mladenov (born 11 May 1962 in Sofia) is a Bulgarian professional basketball coach, and a former professional basketball player. During his playing career, at a height of 1.92 m (6'3 ") tall, he played at the shooting guard and small forward positions.

Professional career
During his club playing career, Mladenov played with Levski Sofia, Stade Nabeulien, Plama Pleven, Slavia Sofia, and Spartak Euroins.

Bulgarian national team
Mladenov was also a member of the senior Bulgarian national basketball team, before retiring in 2003.

Honours and awards

Playing career
Levski Sofia
 Bulgarian League champion (8×): (1979, 1981, 1982, 1986, 1993, 1994, 2000, 2001)
 Bulgarian Cup winner (5×): (1979, 1982, 1983, 1993, 2001)

Stade Nabeulien
 Tunisian League champion: (1992)

Plama Pleven
 Bulgarian League champion (2×): (1995, 1996)
 Bulgarian Cup winner: (1995)

Slavia Sofia
 Bulgarian League champion: (1997)
 Bulgarian Cup winner: (1997)

References

External links
 FIBA Player Profile
 FIBA Europe Player Profile
 Eurobasket.com Coach Profile

1962 births
Living people
Bulgarian men's basketball players
BC Levski Sofia players
Shooting guards
Small forwards
Basketball players from Sofia
Basket Rimini Crabs coaches